Sisu is a Finnish concept described as stoic determination, tenacity of purpose, grit, bravery, resilience, and hardiness and is held by Finns themselves to express their national character. It is generally considered not to have a literal equivalent in English. In contemporary psychology, sisu is shown to have both beneficial and harmful sides.

Meaning
Sisu is extraordinary determination in the face of extreme adversity, and courage that is presented typically in situations where success is unlikely. It expresses itself in taking action against the odds, and displaying courage and resoluteness in the face of adversity; in other words, deciding on a course of action, and then adhering to it even if repeated failures ensue. It is in some ways similar to equanimity, though sisu entails an element of grim stress management.

The English "gutsy" invokes a metaphor related to this one (and found in still other languages): the Finnish usage derives from sisus, translated as "interior", and as "entrails" or "guts"; a closely related English concept evokes the metaphor grit.

As a psychological capacity
Sisu is a term which dates back hundreds of years and is described as being integral to understanding Finnish culture. It is a term for going beyond one's mental or physical capacity, and is a central part of the country's culture and collective discourse. However, hardly any empirical research has been done to explore the meaning of this construct as a possible psychological strength resource, and it has long seemed to have a somewhat elusive nature. It has been usually studied as a cultural component among Finns and Finnish Americans, but as a psychological construct has remained under-researched and poorly defined.

As early as the 1940s, attempts were made to grasp the essence of sisu. The Finnish newspaper Uusi Suomi reached out to its audience for their definition of sisu, and conducted a contest. Uusi-Suomi wrote: "All of us somewhat know what sisu is ... [it] has for long been a topic for discussion here in Finland and abroad. But how do we describe and define what sisu really is?". The quest for putting the essence of sisu into a definitive form has evidently been around for almost a century. More recently, William R. Aho, professor emeritus of sociology at Rhodes College, raised questions about sisu, and stated that "we need a good deal of organized, systematic scientific research to discover the scope and depth of sisu, geographically and situationally, and the depth and strength of both the beliefs and behaviors surrounding and emanating from sisu."

Research that was started in 2013 sought to fill this gap and offer a more precise language for discussing the term. While examining sisu within the psychological framework, it sought to render it less elusive as a construct by giving it an easily citable definition rooted within the field of positive psychology. Sisu as a psychological power potential was introduced for the first time in the 3rd World Congress on Positive Psychology in Los Angeles on 29 June 2013.  In the study, sisu is described as a psychological key competence which enables extraordinary action to overcome a mentally or physically challenging situation. Sisu also contributes to what has been named the action mindset; a consistent, courageous approach toward challenges which at first seem to exceed our capacities. 

A related on-line survey conducted between March and May 2013, tracked the cultural representations of sisu among contemporary Finns, and Finnish Americans, and revealed that sisu is still deeply valued, and that there is public interest for cultivating this strength capacity as well. All in all, the study received over 1,000 responses and the data was the basis for thematic analysis. Among the main findings was the perception of sisu as a reserve of power, which enables extraordinary action to overcome mentally or physically challenging situations, rather than being the ability to pursue long-term goals and be persistent. To elaborate on the function of sisu: it is a psychological potential that enables the individual to tap into strength beyond their pre-conceived resources. Wielding sisu in the face of adversity helps individuals push through what first seemed like the boundaries of their mental or physical capacities. 

Sisu is an action mindset that equips the individual to choose to take on challenges beyond their observed capacities. It provides the final empowering push when we would otherwise hesitate to act. Sisu can be conceptualized as taking action against the odds. Even though 53% of the respondents believed some people innately have more sisu, a majority of 83% of the respondents believed that sisu is a flexible quality that can be cultivated through conscious practice, rather than being a fixed quality, and the majority of respondents were interested in developing this capacity. The research on sisu is currently continued on the Ph.D. level at Aalto University School of Science in Espoo, Finland. 

Sisu is not always an entirely positive quality. In Finnish, pahansisuinen literally translated means one possessing bad sisu, a description of a hostile and malignant person. The answers from the sisu survey indicate that there can be too much sisu, and according to the survey answers this leads to bull-headedness, foolhardiness, self-centeredness and inflexible thinking. The study suggests that sisu should be informed by reason and cultivated and practiced with self-compassion.

Like any trait or psychological capacity, sisu is the complex product of genetic, psychological, biological and social factors, and its comprehensive understanding will require studies from multiple scientific perspectives. Finland may have the initial monopoly on sisu as a cultural construct, but it is a universal capacity and the potential for it exists within all individuals. The transformative power of narrative is widely acknowledged. Through the process of social transfer of narratives, values become embedded within a culture and connected to the thought processes of its individuals. 

People, through their choices and actions, bring these narratives to life in a dynamic process which can prime the behavior of an entire nation. Fostering sisu may very well be embedded in such behavior, rather than being a genetical trait which one is born with. Sisu is a new term in the field of positive psychology, and it may contribute to our understanding of the determinants of resilience, as well as of achievement and the good life. It is suggested that positive psychology research could benefit from focusing future interest on the unique cultural resource of sisu that individuals across the globe can leverage; as well as actively examining relevant constructs from other cultures.

Cultural significance

Sisu has been described as "the word that explains Finland", and the Finns' "favorite word"—"the most wonderful of all their words."
As defined by Roman Schatz in his book From Finland with Love (2005), sisu is an ability to finish a task successfully.
During the famous Winter War of 1939–1940, the Finnish perseverance in the face of the invasion by the Soviet Union popularized this word in English for a generation.
In what may have been the first use of sisu in the English language, on 8 January 1940, Time magazine reported:

Even in 2009, sisu has been described as so essential to the Finnish national character that "to be a real Finn" you must have it: "willpower, tenacity, persistency."

Examples
Singled out for kudos for this attribute was "Finland's wiry old peasant President, Kyösti Kallio—73 years old and full of sisu (courage)—last week thought up a new scheme to get supplies for his country."
It was also used to describe the Finnish stubbornness in sticking to its loose alliance with The Third Reich from 1941 to 1944 (in the war against the Soviet Union, which had attacked Finland on 30 November 1939):

During the 1952 Summer Olympics, sisu was further described in the context of the continuing Cold War looming over the Finnish capital city of Helsinki:

Well into the 1960s, sisu is used to describe the Finnish resistance to the invasion of 20 to 30 years prior and its continuing discontents. In 1960, Austin Goodrich's book, Study in Sisu: Finland's Fight for Independence, was published by Ballantine. Also in 1960, a notable reviewer of Griffin Taylor's novel, Mortlake, wrote:

In 2004, Jorma Ollila, CEO of Nokia, described his company's "guts" by using the word sisu:

A Finnish heavy metal rock singer injured himself, without noticing, at a concert, to which a reviewer wrote:

The concept is widely known in the Upper Peninsula of Michigan, which is home to a large concentration of Americans of Finnish descent.  This has extended to include a popular bumper sticker saying "got sisu?" or simply "SISU".
In 2010, a 63-year-old Yooper named Joe Paquette Jr. of Munising, Michigan, walked 425 miles to the Detroit Lions training facility to bring the spirit of sisu to the team.

The non-profit documentary SISU: Family, Love and Perseverance from Finland to America was made by Finnish-American filmmaker Marko Albrecht. The documentary looks at sisu through a powerful profile of his late mother, his Finnish-American family, and his uncle Heikki's tragic fight against pancreatic cancer.  The film has been a called a time-capsule of modern Finnish-American life.

In a 2008 episode of Top Gear, F1 racer Mika Häkkinen described sisu to James May:

As a proper name

Due to its cultural significance, sisu is a common element of brand names in Finland.
For example, there are Sisu trucks (and Sisu armored vehicles), the icebreaker MS Sisu, a brand of strong-tasting pastilles manufactured by Leaf and Suomen Sisu, a Finnish nationalist organisation with connections to other far-right groups.

Sisu is also a male name with increasing popularity. More than 2,000 Finnish men have this name, most of them being born after 2010. The son of The Dudesons's Jukka Hilden is called Sisu.

Globally, there are several fitness-related organizations and endurance sports teams such as the Sisu Project based in Haverhill and Worcester, Massachusetts, US that carry the name sisu and base their philosophy on the characteristics included in the concept sisu, including courage, integrity, honesty, and determination.

Mount Sisu is the name of a mountain first ascended by mountain climbers Veikka Gustafsson and Patrick Degerman in the Antarctic.

Sisu is also the name of a London-based hedge-fund, operated by several directors including Joy Seppala. The firm bought the football club Coventry City FC in 2007.

In Norway there is a seafood company named Sisu Seafood Norway AS that exports Norwegian seafoods.

On the Western end of Michigan's Upper Peninsula, the SISU Ski Fest is a popular annual event, highlighting a 21- and 42-kilometer cross-country ski race "finishing" in historic downtown Ironwood.

According to the Finnish Population Register Centre's name service, over 2,000 Finnish men have the first name "Sisu". The name gained popularity especially in the 2000s and 2010s.

In popular culture
In season 2 of McLaren's animated program Tooned, Sisu is a planet and the true origin of two-time Formula One Drivers' Champion Mika Häkkinen (and possibly 2007 Drivers' Champion Kimi Räikkönen as well, based on a Sisu scene near the end of the episode in question). Häkkinen and Räikkönen are both Finnish and have driven for McLaren; Häkkinen won both of his titles with the team while Räikkönen won his after leaving McLaren for Ferrari.

A starship with a crew of partly Finnish descent in Robert A. Heinlein's 1957 science fiction novel Citizen of the Galaxy is named Sisu.

A World War II movie titled Sisu, directed by Jalmari Helander and starring Jorma Tommila, is set to be released in April, 2023.

See also
 Chutzpah, an Ashkenazi Jewish word for audacity
 Cojones, Spanish term used for "having what it takes" (also used and spelled as "Colhões" in Portugal)
 Drive theory; analyses, classifies and defines psychological drives
 Ganbaru, a Japanese word with a similar meaning
 Intention (criminal law)
 Psychological resilience
 Seny, the Catalan concept of good sense
 Sisunautti, Finnish word combining 'sisu' with 'astronaut'
 Stiff upper lip, British expression for fortitude and stoicism
 Sumud, a Palestinian Arabic word with a similar meaning
 Vīrya, Buddhist attitude of gladly engaging in wholesome activities

References

External links

Embodied fortitude: An introduction to the Finnish construct of sisu' a research paper at the International Journal of Wellbeing (2019)
Lahti's website and blog with resources on sisu
Washington Post: "The Finnish Line", about Finnish fortitude and resilience
UP SISU: "The Finns of Northern Michigan", about Finnish culture in Northern Michigan
a YouTube video where Mika Häkkinen explains what sisu is (starts at 4:32)

Finnish culture
Positive psychology
Finnish words and phrases
Words and phrases describing personality